The 2022 BYU Cougars women's volleyball team represents Brigham Young University in the 2022 NCAA Division I women's volleyball season. The Cougars are led by eighth year head coach Heather Olmstead and play their home games at the Smith Fieldhouse. The Cougars are competing as members of the WCC for the final season, as they'll join the Big 12 Conference for 2023. 

BYU comes off a season where they finished first and won the WCC regular season championship. The Cougars received an automatic bid to the NCAA Tournament falling to Purdue in the Sweet 16. The Cougars come in as favorites to win the 2022 conference title.

Season

Pre-season honors
Four Cougars were selected to the Pre-season All-WCC team: Senior setter Whitney Bower, senior middle blocker Heather Gneiting, senior opposite hitter Kate Grimmer and junior outside hitter Erin Livingston. The four selections tied BYU with San Diego for the most 2022 Preseason All-WCC team selections.

Alleged Duke incident
The 5,507 fans that attended the Duke game set a record for the most fans attending a BYU Women's Volleyball game at the Smith Fieldhouse.  More than 1,000 fans were turned away as the only seats empty were some student season ticket seats. 

During the Duke-BYU game, with BYU leading 6-3, Duke sophomore Rachel Richardson came up to serve and later recounted that in that moment, she "very distinctly...heard a very strong and negative racial slur."  Once the set was over, Richardson informed the Duke coaching staff, who informed the game officials, who informed BYU staffers, who assigned a campus officer to monitor the student section. The officer later wrote an official report outlining his actions, including that he didn't hear any abusive comments during the fourth set. After the game was complete, a Duke assistant coach confronted the officer, pointing to a particular person in the student section and questioned why the person had not been ejected during the game. The officer and BYU officials reviewed game footage to find evidence that the fan shouted a racial slur, found none, but decided to ban the fan from attending BYU events indefinitely until further investigation was completed.

The following day, Richardson’s godmother brought the situation widespread attention when she tweeted that Richardson was called the slur "every time she served." The Duke vs. Rider match was moved from BYU to a local high school where only family and friends of the schools were allowed admittance. 

Two days after the incident, having flown back to North Carolina, Richardson tweeted out a statement saying "my fellow African American teammates and I were targeted and racially heckled throughout the entirety of the match. The slurs and comments grew into threats which caused us to feel unsafe." In response, BYU Athletics sent out a general press release outlining the school's official stance on all racism. Duke released a statement supporting the allegations of Richardson. Richardson was interviewed on ESPN where she repeated the allegations. 

On September 9, BYU announced it had concluded its investigation into the incident and that it could not corroborate the claims of racism at the match and reinstated the fan who had been banned.

Roster

Schedule

 *-Indicates Conference Opponent
 y-Indicates NCAA Playoffs
 Times listed are Mountain Time Zone.

Announcers for televised games
All home games will be on BYUtv or the BYUtv App with the exception of San Diego, which will be on ESPNU. Most road games will also be televised or streamed on WCC Network with ACC Network Extra picking up the Georgia Tech game and Pac-12 Network picking up the Utah game. 
Rider: Jarom Jordan & Amy Gant
Duke: Jarom Jordan, Amy Gant, & Kenzie Koerber
Washington State: Jarom Jordan, Amy Gant, & Kenzie Koerber
Utah State: Jarom Jordan, Amy Gant, & Kenzie Koerber
Cincinnati: Jarom Jordan, Amy Gant, & Kenzie Koerber
Pitt: Jarom Jordan, Amy Gant, & Kenzie Koerber
Georgia Tech: Andy Demetra & Kele Eveland 
Utah: Krista Blunk
Utah Valley: Brandon Crow & Amy Gant
Loyola Marymount: Jarom Jordan, Amy Gant, & Kenzie Koerber
Pepperdine: Jarom Jordan, Amy Gant, & Kenzie Koerber
Portland: Bryan Sleik & Carlie Dumanon
Gonzaga: Thomas Gallagher
Santa Clara: Jarom Jordan, Amy Gant, & Kenzie Koerber
San Francisco: Jarom Jordan, Amy Gant, & Kenzie Koerber
Saint Mary's: Dr. Joaquin Wallace & Jordan Watkins
Pacific: Jeff Dominick
San Diego: David Gentile
Gonzaga: Jarom Jordan, Amy Gant, & Kenzie Koerber
Portland: Jarom Jordan, Amy Gant, & Kenzie Koerber
San Francisco: Pat Olson
Santa Clara: Kylen Mills
Saint Mary's: Jarom Jordan, Amy Gant, & Kenzie Koerber
Pepperdine: Al Epstein
Loyola Marymount: Jonathan Grace
San Diego: Paul Sunderland & Kevin Barnett
James Madison: Jeff Hathhorn & Amanda Silay 
Pitt: Jeff Hathhorn & Amanda Silay

References
For information on BYU's other athletic sports this season please check out the following:

2022 team
2022 in sports in Utah
BYU
BYU